Saint Philip, São Filipe, or San Felipe may refer to:

People
 Saint Philip the Apostle
 Saint Philip the Evangelist also known as Philip the Deacon
 Saint Philip Neri
 Saint Philip Benizi de Damiani also known as Saint Philip Benitius or Filippo Benizzi, from Florence, 13th century
 Saint Philip Minh Van Doan of the Vietnamese Martyrs

Places

In the Americas
 Saint Philip Parish, Antigua and Barbuda
 The Parish of Saint Philip, Barbados, located in Barbados
 San Felipe, Baja California, Mexico
 San Felipe, Orange Walk, Belize
 San Felipe, Guainía, Colombia
 Saint Philip, Indiana, United States
 San Felipe Pueblo, New Mexico, United States
 San Felipe, Texas, United States
 Del Rio, Texas, United States, formerly named San Felipe Del Rio
 San Felipe, Yucatán, Mexico
 San Felipe, Lima, a neighborhood in Jesus Maria District, Peru
 San Felipe, Yaracuy, in Venezuela
 San Felipe de Puerto Plata, in the Dominican Republic
 San Felipe, Chile
 San Felipe, Retalhuleu, in Guatemala
 San Felipe, Panama, a division of Panama City
 Castillo de San Felipe (disambiguation)

Elsewhere
 São Filipe, Cape Verde
 São Filipe, Cape Verde (municipality)
 Sint Philipsland (island), a former island in the Dutch province of Zeeland
 Sint Philipsland (village), a village in the Dutch municipality of Tholen
 San Felipe, Zambales, in the Philippines
 San Felipe, fictional island in the novel Success To The Brave by Douglas Reeman (writing as Alexander Kent)

Ships
 San Felipe (shipwreck), wrecked in Florida
 San Felipe incident (1596), wrecked in Japan
 San Felipe incident (1835), involved in a naval battle between Mexico and Texas

Other uses
 Saint Philip (Nanni di Banco), a c. 1410–1412 sculpture of Philip the Apostle
 Convento de San Felipe el Real, a former convent in Madrid
 San Felipe Cooperative School in Lima, Peru

See also
 San Felipe Municipality (disambiguation)
 Philip (disambiguation)